Jang Tae-wan (장태완, 張泰玩, 13 September 1931 – 26 July 2010) was an army general and politician of South Korea.

Jang was the commander of the Capital Garrison Command (now Capital Defense Command) during the Coup d'état of December Twelfth. The Hanahoe, the group of South Korean military officers who were the instigators of the coup d'état, tried to appease Jang. However, the staunch Jang rejected it. Instead, Jang cursed and swore at them strongly, "You god damn rebels! Do not move and stay there! I will drive a tank right now and blow your heads away!"(), and fought against the rebel troops. However he was defeated, being betrayed by his subordinates.

Jang was imprisoned and tortured while his son, a student of Korea's Top Ranked Seoul National University, died under suspicious circumstances and was reputedly murdered by government agents; Jang's father starved himself to death.

In later years, he served as the President of KOSCOM (Korea Securities Computer Corporation), and as President of the Korean Veterans Association.

Jang Tae-Wan died in 2010 and was buried with full honors in the Generals' section of Daejon National Cemetery. Many Korean people value him as a symbol of a true soldier, who had stood against coup d´état.

See also 
 Chun Doo-hwan
 Roh Tae-woo
 Jeong Seung-hwa

References

South Korean politicians
South Korean generals
1931 births
Korean torture victims
2010 deaths
Korean military personnel of the Vietnam War
Indong Jang clan